The Atlantic Superstore Monctonian Challenge (known previously as the Lady Monctonian Invitational Spiel and the Lady Monctonian Invitational as it was an only women's event) is an annual bonspiel, or curling tournament, held at Curl Moncton in Moncton, New Brunswick. It was part of the women's World Curling Tour from 2004 to 2019 and joined the men's tour in 2019. The tournament is held in a round robin format.

Past Champions

Women

Men

References

2004 establishments in New Brunswick
Curling competitions in Moncton